Come Fly with Me is the eleventh studio album by British-Australian singer Peter Andre, released on 16 October 2015 by East West Records. The album is Andre's second swing album following the release of Big Night in 2014, however, unlike Big Night, the album consists mostly of covers of Rat Pack classics, as well as three original songs and a swing version of his former hit "Mysterious Girl".

Background
The album was recorded to coincide with Andre's appearance on the latest series of Strictly Come Dancing. The album was produced by Nick Southwood, and features bassist Adam King, drummer Adrian Meehan and keyboardist Rich Milner. Andre said of the album: “All of these songs are great great classics. The fact that we’re celebrating hundred years of Frank Sinatra makes the choice even better because you can start to pick some of the favourites that Franky was really well-known for. When you listen to these old classics, you realise what real music is.”

On 28 September 2015 Andre released a music video for "Come Fly with Me" exclusively via Heatworld.com. One of the tracks on the album, "Little Miss Notting Hill", was written by fellow swing band the Overtones, alongside producer Southwood.

The release of the album was to be accompanied by a 16-date tour in 2016, entitled the Come Swing with Me tour. The tour will incorporate both arenas and theatres, and includes a flagship show at the 02 Arena in London on 20 March 2016.

Track listing

Charts

References

Peter Andre albums
2015 albums